OSMF is an initialism that may refer to:

 Old Settler's Music Festival, an annual music festival in Texas
 Open Source Media Framework, a software framework for Web and desktop applications
 OpenStreetMap Foundation, a nonprofit foundation that promotes open geospatial data
 Oral submucous fibrosis, a medical condition